Mario is the self-titled debut studio album by American singer-songwriter Mario. It was released on July 23, 2002, by J Records. The album debuted at number 9 on the US Billboard 200, with first week sales of 96,000 copies and was eventually certified Gold by the Recording Industry Association of America (RIAA) for sales in excess of 500,000 copies in the United States. Mario was supported by three singles, including "Just a Friend 2002", "Braid My Hair" and "C'Mon".

Promotion
In 2002, during rapper Bow Wow tour, Mario was one of the opening act, alongside R.O.C. and Denim. In 2003, he also been on each tour alongside Nick Cannon, AJA, Jhené, Marques Houston and B2K, as one of the supporting acts for the 2003's Scream Tour III.

Singles
The debut single from the album, "Just a Friend 2002", a cover of Biz Markie's hit "Just a Friend", was released on May 4, 2002. Produced by Warryn Campbell, the song outperformed to its original, peaking at number 4 on the US Billboard Hot 100. It also reached at number 2 on the Hot R&B/Hip-Hop Songs, becoming Mario's second most successful single in the United States. "Just a Friend 2002" also reached at number 18 in the United Kingdom. "Braid My Hair" was released as the album's second single on September 7, 2002. Another Campbell procution, it was less sucesssful on the charts, peaking at number 74 on the US Billboard Hot 100, while reaching at number 18 on the Hot R&B/Hip-Hop Songs. Third and final single, "C'Mon" was released on January 9, 2003. It peaked at number 61 on the US Hot R&B/Hip-Hop Songs, and number 28 in the United Kingdom.

Critical reception

Dan LeRoy from AllMusic stated that the album "offers doses of the real thing; its combination of Nickelodeon-style charm and authentic substance are reminiscent of nothing so much as a young Michael Jackson, with none of the creepy subtext [...] Naturally, you have to excuse a certain amount of filler to believe fully in Mario's potential, but most of these 11 tracks offer generous hints of it." In his review for USA Today, Steve Jones noted that "Mario has a mature-for-his-age voice that sets him apart from the pack, even though he sticks with themes that don't make him seem older than he is [...] Radio-friendly grooves such as "Just a Friend" should get him immediate attention, but the soulful ballad "Never" suggests he's only scratching the surface of what he has to offer."

Chart performance
Mario debuted and peaked at mumber 9 on the US Billboard 200 in the week of August 10, 2022, with first week sales of 96,000 copies. It also reached number three on the Top R&B/Hip-Hop Albums chart. On September 15, 2002, the album was certified Gold by the Recording Industry Association of America (RIAA) for sales in excess of 500,000 copies in the United States.

Track listing

Sample credits
 "Put Me On" contains a sample of "I'll Do Anything for You" performed by Denroy Morgan.

Personnel

Mario – vocals, background vocals
Manny Marroquin – mixing
Tony Maserati – mixing
Ben Arondale – mixing
Tony Black – mixing
Jon Gass – mixing
Mischke – arranger, background vocals, vocal producer
Alicia Keys – background vocals,  instrumentation
John Jubu Smith – guitar
Neil Stubenhaus – bass
Jan Fairchild – engineer
Dave Russell – engineer
Thor Laewe – engineer
Jeff Allen – engineer
Tony Black – engineer
Xavier Marquez – guitar
Erik Steinert – pro-tools
Troy Patterson – executive producer
Peter Edge – executive producer
Clive Davis – executive producer
Ronald B. Gillyard – A&R
Larry Jackson – A&R
Michael Lavine – photography
Chris LeBeau – photo production
Gregory Burke – cover
June Ambrose – stylist
Jolie Levine-Aller – production coordination
Sandra Campbell – project coordination
Warryn Campbell – instrumentation

Charts

Weekly charts

Year-end charts

Certifications

Release history

References

2002 debut albums
Mario (American singer) albums
J Records albums
Albums produced by Clive Davis
Albums produced by Alicia Keys
Albums produced by the Underdogs (production team)
Albums produced by Warryn Campbell